Yusuf Mohamed (born 5 November 1983) is a retired Nigerian football defender who played as a right-back.

Career
A defender, Mohamed won the African Champions league title with Enyimba in 2003 and 2004, before moving to Sudanese club Al-Hilal.

On 23 January 2009, he completed a move to Swiss side FC Sion from Al-Hilal. Mohammed underwent a medical and agreed on a three-and-a-half year deal in time to beat the transfer deadline, following in the footsteps of compatriot Obinna Nwaneri, who also joined Sion in 2007 after breaking into the Super Eagles squad.

Mohammed, who has five caps for his country, previously passed a trial with French side Paris Saint-Germain F.C., but opted to fulfill a pre-contract agreement with the Switzerland club instead.

He returned to Al-Hilal in May 2010. He currently rehabbing from an injury suffered at the 2010 Africa Cup of Nations that led to him being excluded from the 2010 FIFA World Cup team.

Honours
 CAF Champions League: 2003, 2004
 Sudan Premier League: 2005, 2006, 2007

References

External links

FC Sion profile 

1983 births
Living people
Nigerian footballers
Nigeria international footballers
2010 Africa Cup of Nations players
Nigerian expatriate footballers
Expatriate footballers in Switzerland
Association football defenders
Enyimba F.C. players
FC Sion players
Swiss Super League players
Al-Hilal Club (Omdurman) players
People from Aba, Abia